Thomas "Tom" Matthews (born 19 August 1992) is a British Paralympic table tennis player. At the 2020 Summer Paralympics, he won a bronze medal in the Men's individual class 1 event. Matthews is also a European champion and a World bronze medalist.

In 2009, Matthews was a very keen mountain biker, he went out for a bike ride with his uncle and a friend. Matthews went over the handle bars and broke his neck after going down a mountain too fast. While in rehabilitation in Rookwood Hospital, he was encouraged to try table tennis by Welsh para table tennis Paralympic medalist James Munkley when Munkley was visiting hospital wards in Wales and then Matthews joined the Welsh table tennis team in 2013 and competed internationally a year later.

References

External links

1992 births
Living people
Welsh male table tennis players
Paralympic table tennis players of Great Britain
Paralympic bronze medalists for Great Britain
Paralympic medalists in table tennis
Table tennis players at the 2020 Summer Paralympics
Medalists at the 2020 Summer Paralympics
Sportspeople from Merthyr Tydfil